Erik Janža (born 21 June 1993) is a Slovenian professional footballer who plays as a left-back for Górnik Zabrze.

Honours
Maribor
Slovenian Championship: 2014–15
Slovenian Cup: 2015–16

References

External links
Erik Janža profile at NZS 

1993 births
Living people
People from Murska Sobota
Slovenian footballers
Association football fullbacks
Slovenia youth international footballers
Slovenia under-21 international footballers
Slovenia international footballers
Slovenian expatriate footballers
ND Mura 05 players
NK Domžale players
NK Maribor players
FC Viktoria Plzeň players
Pafos FC players
NK Osijek players
Górnik Zabrze players
Slovenian Second League players
Slovenian PrvaLiga players
Czech First League players
Cypriot First Division players
Croatian Football League players
Ekstraklasa players
Slovenian expatriate sportspeople in the Czech Republic
Expatriate footballers in the Czech Republic
Slovenian expatriate sportspeople in Cyprus
Expatriate footballers in Cyprus
Slovenian expatriate sportspeople in Croatia
Expatriate footballers in Croatia
Slovenian expatriate sportspeople in Poland
Expatriate footballers in Poland